The Wilhelmine Period comprises the period of German history between 1890 and 1918, embracing the reign of Kaiser Wilhelm II in the German Empire from the resignation of Chancellor Otto von Bismarck until the end of World War I and Wilhelm's abdication during the November Revolution. 
It affected the society, politics, culture, art and architecture of Germany and roughly coincided with the Belle Époque era of Western Europe.

Overview
The term "Wilhelminism" (Wilhelminismus) is not meant as a conception of society associated with the name Wilhelm and traceable to an intellectual initiative of the German Emperor. Rather, it relates to the image presented by Wilhelm II and his demeanour, as manifested by the public presentation of grandiose military parades and self-aggrandisement on his part. The latter tendency had already been noticed by his grandfather, Emperor Wilhelm I, while the latter's father, later Frederick III, was Crown Prince.

Wilhelminism also characterizes the social and cultural climate of Wilhelm II's reign of Wilhem's, which found expression in rigidly-conservative attitudes relying on the Prussian Junker landowners and associated in the German Agrarian League. That resembled the Victorian era in the United Kingdom. The period was distinguished by an extraordinary belief in progress, which contributed to the enormous prosperity of the highly-industrialised German Empire but was at odds with its social conservatism. Although Otto von Bismarck's Anti-Socialist Laws were not renewed, Wilhelm's government continued to implement measures against socialist ideas. Nevertheless, the German Social Democratic Party continued to grow in strength and became the largest faction in the elected Reichstag during the 1912 elections. Despite the party's stronger influence, internal developments were characterised by an increasing loyalty of the party establishment towards the Emperor and the empire. That attitude was condemned as "revisionism" by its opponents but culminated in the Burgfrieden policy of granting loans to fund the German effort during the First World War.

Foreign policy was founded on Wilhelm's imperialist ambitions and directed towards the establishment of Germany as a world power (Weltmacht). The desire for a "place in the sun" as coined by Foreign Secretary Bernhard von Bülow and was shared by a large number of German citizens and intellectuals. Pan-Germanism achieved a short-lived high point after the acquisition of some colonial possessions in Africa and in the South Seas, but external relations deteriorated. In 1890, Germany had refused to prolong the secret Reinsurance Treaty with the Russian Empire that had concluded by Bismarck in 1887, and Germany had to witness the forming of the Franco-Russian Alliance, which presenting a new scenario of a two-front war. Relations with Britain were not strained by the Scramble for Africa but especially by the Anglo-German naval arms race. Wilhelm's fascination with the Imperial German Navy and his ambition to see it established as an instrument for the projection of world power were reflected in everyday German life. Until the mid-20th century, boys were even dressed in sailor suits to impress them at an early age with the Navy's aura and prestige.

The distinctive spiked helmet, the so-called Pickelhaube had existed previously and not only in the German Empire, but it symbolised Wilhelmine period since the Imperial Army and German militarism in general. (In fact, various sign languages still have the extended forefinger placed in front of the forehead, indicating the spiked helmet, as the sign for "German".) "Wilhelmism" is equally applied to the distinctive styles prevailing in the visual arts and architecture of the period, such as the ornate Germania postage stamps, numerous government buildings and the Wilhelmine Ring housing areas of Berlin and many other German cities. The term is also used to describe, among other things, an essentially-Neo-Baroque and extraordinarily-prestige-oriented style of architecture, which is calculated to give expression to the Germany's claim to an imperial power. The style was particularly exemplified by the grandiose Siegesallee, a boulevard of sculptures that was lampooned by Berliners as Puppenallee ("mall of dolls"), and it was given official status by Wilhelm's so-called Rinnsteinrede ("gutter speech") on what he considered to be modernist degenerate art at the inauguration of the extravagant boulevard on December 18, 1901.

See also 
 Der Untertan
 National Kaiser Wilhelm Monument
 Index of Germany-related articles

References

Sources 
Geoff Eley (ed.) and James Retallack (ed.): Wilhelminism and Its Legacies. German Modernities and the Meanings of Reform, 1890-1930. Essays for Hartmut Pogge von Strandmann. Berghahn Books, New York and Oxford, 2003
R. J. Evans (ed.) and Hartmut Pogge von Strandmann (ed.): The Coming of the First World War. Clarendon Press, 1990.
John C. G. Röhl: The Kaiser and His Court: Wilhelm II and the Government of Germany. Cambridge University Press, 1966.
John C. G. Röhl: Wilhelm II : The Kaiser's Personal Monarchy, 1888-1900. Cambridge University Press, 2004.
John C. G. Röhl: Kaiser, Hof und Staat. Wilhelm II. und die deutsche Politik. C. H. Beck, Munich ³1988 (TB 2002), .
John C. G. Röhl: Wilhelm II., C. H. Beck, Munich 1993–2008:
 Volume 1: Die Jugend des Kaisers, 1859–1888. Munich 1993, ²2001, .
 Volume 2: Der Aufbau der Persönlichen Monarchie, 1888–1900. Munich 2001, .
 Volume 3: Der Weg in den Abgrund, 1900–1941. Munich 2008, . (online review by Lothar Machtan, Institut für Geschichtswissenschaft, Bremen University on http://hsozkult.geschichte.hu-berlin.de/)
 Fritz Fischer: Griff nach der Weltmacht. Die Kriegszielpolitik des kaiserlichen Deutschland 1914/18 (1961), Droste 2000 (reprint of special edition, 1967), .

External links 
 Zeitreise – exhibition in Nordrhein-Westfalen
 Preußen – Chronik eines deutschen Staates (ARD series during “Preußenjahr“ 2001)
 Warum der Wilhelminismus als politischer Kampfbegriff nichts taugt - Die Zeit, February 1999

German Empire
Wilhelm II, German Emperor
Periodization
Historiography of Germany
Belle Époque